Five Fields is a modernist residential neighborhood in Lexington, Massachusetts developed starting in 1951. It consists of 68 half-acre (0.2 hectare) lots with modernist houses on an 80-acre site designed by The Architects Collaborative (TAC). Partners in charge from TAC were Norman Fletcher and Louis McMillen with Richard Morehouse as Senior Associate.  A 20-acre portion is held in common and includes community facilities such as a swimming pool and playground.

Five Fields was one of a series of "innovative contemporary housing developments" in Lexington, starting with Six Moon Hill (The Architects Collaborative, 1948), and then Five Fields (1951), Peacock Farm (Walter Pierce and Danforth Compton, 1952), and Turning Mill / Middle Ridge (Carl Koch, 1955). Several other modern housing developments were built later. Like the Case Study Houses in Los Angeles and the other Lexington developments, Five Fields was "intended as a corrective to the cheap historicism of many new developments".

The development was established on the former Cutler dairy farm, near the Waltham line. Stone walls divided the area into five fields. To keep costs down, the houses were originally limited to three standard plans, which allowed the use of common, mass-produced components.

Notes

Bibliography

 Denise Dube, "Modern Art: Lexington's Other Historic Home", North Bridge Magazine, Fall 2008, p. 18–26.
 Amanda Kolson Hurley, "The Rise of the Radical Suburbs", Architect, April 9, 2019, adapted from her book Radical Suburbs: Experimental Living on the Fringes of the American City, 2019, 

Modernist architecture in Massachusetts
Buildings and structures in Lexington, Massachusetts
Houses in Middlesex County, Massachusetts
1950s architecture